The subject of the Adoration of the Magi was treated at least four times by the Dutch or Flemish painter Matthias Stom:
Adoration of the Magi, c.1633-1639, produced during his time in Naples, showing ten figures, now in the Nationalmuseum, Stockholm
Adoration of the Magi, c.1633-1639, produced during his time in Naples, showing eight figures, now in the Musée des Augustins, Toulouse
Adoration of the Magi, c.1640s, possibly produced on Sicily, horizontal format, bought in 1965 by Brian Sewell and sold at the Bonhams London auction of 5 December 2018 at which Brian Sewell's collection was posthumously sold
Adoration of the Magi, later than the Sewell version, horizontal format, now in the Musée des Beaux-Arts de Rouen

References

Paintings in the collection of the Musée des Beaux-Arts de Rouen
Paintings in the collection of the Nationalmuseum Stockholm
Collections of the Musée des Augustins
Paintings by Matthias Stom
Stom
Black people in art